Babbacombe Bay is a South-East Devon shallow, wide, continuation of the main sweep of Lyme Bay which, in turn, to the east is the western end of the Jurassic Coast (mainly in Dorset) in England, UK. It faces east towards the parent, notably large bay of the English Channel, weakly sheltered from large tides from the east but much so from Atlantic tides, currents and storms from the west. It is bounded by: 
Hope's Nose the east end of the steep and jagged northern edge of Torquay, as the bay's southern tip; 
with no prominence bar a short, east-reaching, harbour wall at Teignmouth to the immediate north, the River Teign.

Some of the much removed crystalline deposits of gold at the southern point are in a longstanding exhibit of the Natural History Museum, London. These are notable to mineral collectors. Dawlish along the bay is a town which saw its seaside mainline railway rebuilt quickly due to the unusually fierce 2013–14 United Kingdom winter floods.  

Sand in several places, and cliffs are red-brown.  In nineteenth-century texts the Devonian has been called the "Old Red Age", after the red and brown terrestrial deposits: the Old Red Sandstone in which early fossil discoveries were found. Another common term is "Age of the Fishes", referring to the evolution of several major groups of fish that took place during the period. In older terms nationally it unites the Dittonian, Breconian, and Farlovian stages.

Notes

References
 Merriam-Webster's Geographic Dictionary, Third Edition. Springfield, Massachusetts: Merriam-Webster, Inc., 1997. .
 Road Atlas of Great Britain, Eleventh Edition. Basingstoke, Hampshire, United Kingdom: The Automobile Association, 1991.

Bays of Devon